Bunopus blanfordii, also known commonly as Blanford's ground gecko and Blanford's rock gecko, is a species of lizard in the family Gekkonidae. The species is native to Western Asia.

Etymology
The specific name, blanfordii, is in honor of English naturalist William Thomas Blanford.

Geographic range
B. blanfordii is found in Israel and Jordan.

Reproduction
B. blanfordii is oviparous.

References

Further reading
Goldberg SR, Maza E (2017). "Bunopus blanfordii (Blanford's Rock Gecko). Reproduction". Herpetological Review 48 (4): 845.
Rösler H (2000). "Kommentierte Liste der rezent, subrezent und fossil bekannten Geckotaxa (Reptilia: Gekkonomorpha)". Gekkota 2: 28–153. (Bunopus blanfordii, p. 61). (in German).
Sindaco R, Jeremčenko VK (2008). The Reptiles of the Western Palearctic. 1. Annotated Checklist and Distributional Atlas of the Turtles, Crocodiles, Amphisbaenians and Lizards of Europe, North Africa, Middle East and Central Asia. (Monographs of the Societas Herpetologica Italica). Latina, Italy; Edizioni Belvedere. 580 pp. .
Strauch A (1887). "Bemerkungen über die Geckoniden-Sammlung im zoologischen Museum der kaiserlichen Akademie der Wissenschaften zu St. Petersburg ".  Mémoires de l'Académie Impériale des Sciences de St.-Pétersbourg, Septième Série 35 (2): 1–72. (Bunopus blanfordii, new species, pp. 61–64, Figures 13–14). (in German).

Bunopus
Reptiles described in 1887